Hunter House may refer to:

in Canada
Hunter House, Mississauga, Ontario, Canada

in the United Kingdom
 Hunterhouse College, Finaghy, Belfast, Northern Ireland
 Hunter House (initially St Brycedale), Kirkcaldy, Scotland
 Hunter House Museum, East Kilbride, Scotland

in the United States

Hunter House (Mobile, Alabama), listed on the National Register of Historic Places (NRHP) in Mobile County
Hunter-Coulter House, Ashdown, Arkansas, NRHP-listed in Little River County
Andrew Hunter House, Bryant, Arkansas, NRHP-listed in Saline County
Hunter-Hattenburg House, Kankakee, Illinois, NRHP-listed in Kankakee County
Lucinda Hunter House, Vermont, Illinois, NRHP-listed in Fulton County
Chaffee-Hunter House, Des Moines, Iowa, NRHP-listed in Polk County
Hunter House (Leitchfield, Kentucky), NRHP-listed in Grayson County
John Hunter House (Logana, Kentucky), NRHP-listed in Jessamine County
Jacob Hunter House (New Liberty, Kentucky), NRHP-listed in Owen County
John W. Hunter House, Birmingham, Michigan, NRHP-listed in Oakland County
Hunter House (Detroit), Michigan, NRHP-listed in Wayne County
Mulford T. Hunter House, Detroit, Michigan, NRHP-listed in Wayne County
Hunter-Frost House, Enterprise, Mississippi, NRHP-listed in Clarke County
Hunter-Dawson House, New Madrid, Missouri, NRHP-listed in New Madrid County
Hunter-Lawrence-Jessup House, Woodbury, New Jersey, NRHP-listed in Gloucester County
James Hunter Stone House, Adamsville, Ohio, NRHP-listed in Muskingum County
Avery-Hunter House, Granville, Ohio, NRHP-listed in Licking County
William Hunter House, Tiffin, Ohio, NRHP-listed in Seneca County
Hunter-Morelock House, Wallowa, Oregon, NRHP-listed in Wallowa County
Hunter House at Fort Augusta (Northumberland County, Pennsylvania)
Hunter House (Newport, Rhode Island), NRHP-listed in Newport County
Hunter House (Ridgeway, South Carolina), NRHP-listed in Fairfield County
Witherspoon-Hunter House, York, South Carolina, NRHP-listed in York County
John Hunter House (Franklin, Tennessee), NRHP-listed in Williamson County
Joseph S. Hunter House, Cedar City, Utah, NRHP-listed in Iron County
Hunter House Victorian Museum, Norfolk, Virginia
Frank and Anna Hunter House, Marlinton, West Virginia, NRHP-listed in Pocahontas County

Other
Hunter House Publishers, a publishing house

See also
John Hunter House (disambiguation)
Hunter House Museum (disambiguation)